The All X-League Team is an honor given in Japan to players that performed outstandingly on the gridiron during the X-League regular and post-seasons. Since 2000, the X-League honors outstanding players by electing them to the All X-League Team. 11 offensive players, 11 defensive players and 3 special team players are voted by the Head Coaches and 5 players on each of the 18 X1 teams to be selected for the team. Starting 2019, the All X-League team was divided between 2 classifications: The 8-team X1 Super and 12-team X1 Area with both selecting 11 offensive players, 11 defensive players and 3 special team players and are voted by the Head Coaches and 5 players on each of the teams. In 2020, the X1 Area All X League Team was expanded to include a West and East team due to the shortened season caused by the COVID-19 pandemic.

Past All X-League Teams

2002

2003

2004

2005

2006

2007

2008

2009

2010

2011

2012

2013

2014

2015

2016

2017

2018

2019

X1 Super

X1 Area

2020

X1 Super

X1 Area East

X1 Area West

2021

X1 Super

References

X League homepage

American football leagues
Sports leagues in Japan
American football in Japan
2000 establishments in Japan